Kutari River, also called Cutari Rivier, Kutari Creek or Cutari Creek, is a small river at the South East of the Tigri Area in the extreme South of Suriname.

The river has its source in the Acarai Mountains that border Brazil. Together with the Sipaliwini River the Kutari flows out in the Coeroeni River, where the village of Kwamalasamutu is within ten kilometers eastwards as the crow flies. To the north, the Kutari and the Coeroenie successively form the rivers on the eastern border of the Tigri Area. According to Guyana, this is the frontier of both countries; according to Suriname the border must be drawn at the New River, which forms the west frontier of the Tigri Area.

See also
List of rivers of Suriname

References 

Rivers of the Tigri Area